"One in a Million" is a song recorded by American singer Aaliyah for her second studio album of the same title (1996). It was written by both Missy Elliott and Timbaland with the latter producing the song. Musically, the song is an R&B and club ballad with trip hop and drum and bass influences. Lyrically, it is about Aaliyah professing her love for a man whom she identifies as being her "one in a million". "One in a Million" was released as the third single from One in a Million by Blackground and Atlantic Records on November 26, 1996.

Upon its release, it was met with generally positive reviews from critics, with many praising the song's innovative production. "One in a Million" was a moderate commercial success, peaking at number 25 on the US Radio Songs and atop the R&B/Hip-Hop Airplay chart. Released as a double A-side single with "If Your Girl Only Knew" in the United Kingdom, the song peaked at number 15 on the UK Singles Chart. "One in a Million" was nominated for Best R&B/Soul Single – Female at the 1998 Soul Train Music Awards.

Recording and production
Along with "If Your Girl Only Knew", "One in a Million" was one of the earliest songs which Aaliyah recorded with Timbaland and Missy Elliott. According to Elliot, she wrote the song in a rap-singing style because she didn't know how to write songs for singers, explaining: "Because I wasn’t really a singer like that, that's why I wrote like that, because I was a rapper, but I didn't know how to do a bunch of runs, so every record that I would attack, I would attack it like I'm rap-singing it." During the earliest stages of the recording process, Elliot was scared to play the record to Aaliyah because the song's sound was very different. However, once Aaliyah heard the song, she liked it. In regards to Aaliyah enjoying the song, Elliot said that "she had an ear and she knew what that music made her feel like. She was next level to understand that this is some next level [music]. This is not just the sound that’s going on right now — this is a new sound that is being created. This whole movement is new".

Once the song was completed and sent to radio, radio stations initially didn't want to play it. Many stations made excuses as to why they couldn't play the song by saying "they couldn't blend it in, they couldn't mix it in with records before it or after it because the cadence hadn't been done before". According to Blackground Records CEO Jomo Hankerson, many radio station program directors had a problem with what they called "cricket sounds" in the song. Hankerson recalled that a program director in Chicago stated that he would not play a record that had crickets in it. When trying to create a solution so that "One in a Million" could get played on the radio, Atlantic Records suggested that the song be remixed and made more radio-friendly. Hankerson refused to change the song and took the tapes out of the studio so that no one could remix it, stating: "Atlantic thought we should remix the record and take the triple-beat down to make it more radio-friendly, but we were very bullheaded about it. We heard they were trying to get remixes done, so we took the tapes out the studio! Back in those days before Pro Tools you could really control where the music went. If you had that two-inch reel, you had the record. So we grabbed the two-inch reels and all the tapes so nobody could do any unauthorized remixes and we stuck to our guns on that version of the record".

Music and lyrics
"One in a Million" is a mid-tempo ethereal club ballad with "seductive" funk, electronica, trip hop and drum and bass influences. The song was described by Andrew Unterberger from Billboard as being a "twitchy, booming slow jam that sounded both lush and minimal, expansive and intimate, alien and sexy". Its production, "bursts of rapid-fire staccato beats", that features, "shimmering" synths and crickets. According to Craig Jenkins from Complex, other sounds are utilized within the record such as, "sultry funk accented by hyperactive drum programming and the sounds of birds, crickets and aircraft scattered around the mix". The song "immediately captures your full attention with its pounding bass, quirky synths and chopped vocal samples".

Melodically, "One in a Million" "cadences are similar to those of a rapper", as "she rides the currents of the undulating groove as if she were piloting a hang glider through them". Lyrically, the song is about Aaliyah professing her love for a man whom "she views as one in a million and a love she can't resist". "Baby you don't know, what you do to me/Between me and you, I feel a chemistry/Won't let no one come and take your place/Cause the love you give can't be replaced", she sings. According to Bob Waliszewski from Plugged In, "Aaliyah communicates love and commitment to her man" on the song.

Critical reception
According to Khal from Complex, "One in a Million" "showcased an unstoppable trio, with Aaliyah being a perfect muse for the futuristic vibes that Missy and Timbaland were creating, and truthfully helped change the game. No longer did your slow songs have to have slow drum beats; you could establish that vibe and throw as many fills and skittery hi-hats into the track and make it something unique instead of the flavor of the week (although being so future means that everyone was in demand)". Georgette Cline from The Boombox praised the song, saying "The instrumental itself dripped with sex appeal and Aaliyah's musical stylings only enhanced the vibe. The then 17-year-old struck lyrical gold with, Won't let no one come and take your place/ 'Cause the love you give can't be replaced/ See no one else love me like you do/ That's why I don't mind to spend my life with you." Quentin B. Huff from PopMatters felt that the song represented Aaliyah "better in the slow jam department". He also praised the production of the song, saying: "The beat for "One in a Million" is awfully hard for a romantic song, but that's the point, actually: love—or, at least the type of love portrayed in this song—is beautiful but continual and inexorable". Music publication udiscovermusic felt that Aaliyah's "ethereal vocals" was on full display on the song and that overall the song was "the perfect distillation of all the pervasive sounds of the era". In a retrospective review, Billboard, praised Aaliyah's vocals on the track, saying that she "effortlessly dominates the beat through her inexplicably captivating swagger and tone". Overall, the publication felt that the songs sound "remained untouched" and that it stood apart from other songs from its time period - "Aaliyah was simply ahead of her time — and as always, truly one in a million".

Accolades 

|-
! scope="row"| 1998
| Soul Train Music Award
| Best R&B/Soul Single – Female
| "One in a Million"
| 
| 
|}

Commercial performance 
"One in a Million" peaked atop the US R&B/Hip-Hop Airplay chart on January 4, 1997. On the Rhythmic chart, the song peaked within the top five at number two on March 1, 1997. On March 22, 1997, the song peaked within the top 40 on the Radio Songs chart at number 25. "One in a Million" also peaked at number two on the US Dance Club Songs on May 10, 1997. Due to its radio-only release in the United States, "One in a Million" was ineligible to enter the Billboard Hot 100, as Billboards rules at the time allowed only commercially-available singles to chart.

"One in a Million" was released as a double A-side single with "If Your Girl Only Knew" in the United Kingdom, peaking within at number 15 on the UK Singles Chart. The song peaked within the top five on the UK Dance Chart on May 25, 1997, and on the UK R&B Chart on June 29, 1997. According to the Official Charts Company (OCC), "One in a Million" is Aaliyah's sixth best-selling single in the United Kingdom. The song also peaked within the top 20 in New Zealand, at number 11, on June 15, 1997.

In August 2021, it was reported that the album and Aaliyah's other recorded work for Blackground (since rebranded as Blackground Records 2.0) would be re-released on physical, digital, and streaming services in a deal between the label and Empire Distribution. One in a Million was reissued on August 20, 2021, despite Aaliyah's estate issuing a statement in response to Blackground 2.0's announcement, denouncing the "unscrupulous endeavor to release Aaliyah's music without any transparency or full accounting to the estate". Following the album's re-release, "One in a Million" debuted at number seven on the US Digital Song Sales the week of September 4, 2021.

Music video

Background
The music video for "One in a Million" was directed by Paul Hunter and was filmed in Los Angeles. Hunter first met Aaliyah through her uncle while at a meeting in a New York studio; soon after their meeting, he was chosen as the director for the video.
According to Hunter, everything went well during the filming and they remained on schedule.
Hunter also recalled that when they were moving to another shooting location, Aaliyah drove in the car with the production crew. He stated: "She was this young superstar and we need to go to the next location and she just rides over with the crew", adding: "She didn't call for a limo or anything. It was really cute. She was just a regular girl in that respect, y'know?".

Fashion
For the music video she worked with stylist Derek Lee for the first time. In an interview with Complex, Lee recalled that his agent referred him to Aaliyah due to her having issues with other stylists. “My agent said stylists were always bringing her stuff she didn’t like because they always wanted to put her in a dress,”. “And once I found out it was Aaliyah, I was like yeah. This is right up my alley.” After meeting with Aaliyah, Lee got a call asking if he could immediately fly back to Los Angeles to style the “One In A Million” video. Due to it being short notice "he had to bring completely new pieces and only had a few hours to retrieve them".  He retrieved clothes from sex shops on Christopher Street in New York’s West Village because it was "the only clothing stores open late at night".  He also asked his "stylist assistant in LA to request the motorcycle jumpsuit she wore to be sent from New York to Los Angeles overnight".

Synopsis
The video starts with Aaliyah lying on the hood of a black Cadillac DeVille convertible with Missy Elliott and Timbaland sitting inside of it. Soon, several reporters and fans rush to the car. Then, the scene switches to a dark room where Aaliyah is sitting as Ginuwine approaches her. In another scene, she is watching him in an off white-colored room via security camera. The scene shifts to a completely white room where Aaliyah is dancing with another male and then to the scene where Ginuwine is looking at the security camera. In the latter scene, Aaliyah enters the room and reveals a tattoo of her name on Ginuwine's arm. Once again, the scene goes back to the dark room, but this time Aaliyah is standing up and performing in a white bodysuit. The video ends with Aaliyah riding a motorcycle with Dealz (the son of Jackie Jackson).

Reception
During its chart run, the video for "One in a Million" received heavy television airplay on multiple networks. For the week ending November 10, 1996, the video made its television debut on BET and The Box. Eventually, the video became the eighth most-played video on BET for the week ending February 16, 1997. For the week ending January 5, 1997, the video made its television debut on MTV. The video became the seventh most-played video on MTV the week ending February 23, 1997. In February 1997, the video for "One in a Million" made its television debut on the cable network channel VH1.

In a 1997 article discussing the video, MTV felt that Aaliyah was getting "all grown up and steamy in the video". Jordan Simon from Idolator felt that the video for "One in a Million" displayed a striking resemblance to various futuristic science fiction films, such as Aliens, The Fifth Element and The Matrix. The video was also featured on Complexs list "The Best R&B Videos of the '90s".

Live performances
On February 14, Aaliyah performed "One in a Million" on Live with Regis and Kathie Lee ; Four days later on February 18, she performed the song on The Tonight Show with Jay Leno. On February 21, 1997 Aaliyah Performed "If Your girl Only Knew" and "One in a Million", on Showtime at the Apollo. In March, Aaliyah made an appearance at the annual MTV Spring Break event in Panama City, Florida. During the event, Aaliyah performed "One in a Million" and hosted a segment from The Grind, where she interviewed the Spice Girls before their performance. In September 1997, Aaliyah performed "One in a Million" on the Nickelodeon sketch comedy show All That.

Legacy
In 2010, singer-songwriter The-Dream recorded a cover of "One in a Million". In May 2011, Omarion covered the song for his mixtape as a tribute to Aaliyah. Also, Canadian singer-songwriter Keshia Chanté, who was once set to play as Aaliyah in her biopic movie, covered the song as a tribute for the tenth anniversary of Aaliyah's death. On August 25, 2012, hip hop artist Blizzy Ballard and Aaliyah's former collaborator Smoke E. Digglera, lead singer of R&B group Playa, released a tribute cover of the song. The song was also sampled by Australian rapper Iggy Azalea for her song "Backseat Trill $hit". R&B and hip hop artist Tink released a song titled "Million", sampling "One in a Million", with production by Timbaland. American singer Normani's 2021 single "Wild Side", featuring American rapper Cardi B, interpolates the drum pattern from "One in a Million".

According to Billboard, “One in a Million bridged often-juxtaposed worlds: The track is a gentle ballad over a tough beat, melding together rugged and smooth with ease. Across the song’s 4:30 runtime, the trio joined forces to pioneer an unprecedented R&B lane, defined by its versatility". Journalist Craig Seymour from The Buffalo News, stated that "One In a Million" "changed the sound of pop and R&B radio", and that "it's the reason that polyrhythmic smashes such as Christina Aguilera's "Genie in a Bottle" and Destiny's Child's "Say My Name" exist". Writer Da’Shan Smith from Revolt, credits the song for creating the "Electro-Hop&B" sub-genre that was popular in the late 90s & 2000s. According to Smith, "The first to truly place her foot on the gas with the help of Virginia’s finest was Aaliyah. In 1996, at Pyramid Studios in Ithaca, New York, the trio would record Aaliyah’s titular track from her sophomore album, One In A Million. Unlike anything else on radio, “One In A Million” stood out for incorporating London’s drum and bass electronic sound with slow-winding R&B synthesizers". Pitchfork ranked the song at number 36 on its "The 250 Best Songs of the 1990s" list.

Track listings and formats

European maxi CD single and 12-inch vinyl
"One in a Million" (album version) – 4:31
"One in a Million" (remix featuring Ginuwine) – 5:07
"One in a Million" (instrumental) – 4:31
"One in a Million" (a cappella) – 4:31

Australian maxi CD single
"One in a Million" (album version) – 4:31
"One in a Million" (remix featuring Ginuwine) – 5:07
"One in a Million" (Dark Child Remix) – 4:42
"One in a Million" (Geoffrey C Edit) – 4:01
"One in a Million" (Nitebreed Bootleg Mix) – 7:15
"One in a Million" (Armand's Drum & Bass Mix) – 7:09

"If Your Girl Only Knew"/"One in a Million"
"If Your Girl Only Knew" (radio edit) – 3:55
"If Your Girl Only Knew" (The New Remix) – 4:58
"One in a Million" (Dark Child Remix) – 4:41
"One in a Million" (Armand's Drum & Bass Mix) – 7:11

"The One I Gave My Heart To"/"One in a Million"
"The One I Gave My Heart To" (Soul Solution club mix)
"The One I Gave My Heart To" (Soul Solution dub)
"One in a Million" (Nitebreed Mongolidic mix) 
"One in a Million" (Geoffrey's House mix)
"One in a Million" (Armand's Drum & Bass mix) 
"One in a Million" (Wolf-D Big Bass mix) 
"One in a Million" (Nitebreed dub)

Charts

Weekly charts

Year-end charts

Release history

Notes

References

External links
 

1996 singles
Aaliyah songs
Music videos directed by Paul Hunter (director)
Song recordings produced by Timbaland
Songs written by Missy Elliott
Songs written by Timbaland
1996 songs
Blackground Records singles
Contemporary R&B ballads
1990s ballads